Natale Gonnella (born 19 January 1976) is an Italian retired footballer.

Gonnella played more than 250 matches at Serie B.

Club career
Born in Colleferro, in the province of Rome, Gonnella started his career at northern giant Internazionale. In 1995, he left for Serie C1 side Gualdo then Ravenna of Serie B.

In 1997, he joined Hellas Verona where he played until 2003. In January 2003 he joined Atalanta of Serie A, in exchange with Mauro Minelli. After the team relegated in June 2003, partnered with Gianpaolo Bellini he played as a regular starter in Serie B and won promotion back to Serie A. Since the return of Cesare Natali, he just played 9 league matches before left on loan to Arezzo in January 2005. Since 2005–06 season he left on loan at Pescara of Serie B and turned permanent in January 2007. After Pescara relegated, in July 2007 he left for Grosseto of Serie B.

In January 2008, he returned to Hellas Varona on loan to play at Serie C1. In March 2009, he canceled his contract with Grosseto.

In November 2009, he signed a contract until end of season for Como. In the next season he was signed by Casale.

International career
Gonnella capped for Italy at 1992 UEFA European Under-16 Football Championship qualification and final phase. He also played for the Italy Under-18 side during their 1994 UEFA European Under-18 Football Championship qualification campaign, and was a member of the side that lost to Russia U-18 in the qualification playoffs.

References

External links
 Profile at La Gazzetta dello Sport (2007–08) 
 Profile at AIC.Football.it 
 Profile at FIGC 

1976 births
Living people
People from Colleferro
Italian footballers
Inter Milan players
A.S. Gualdo Casacastalda players
Ravenna F.C. players
Hellas Verona F.C. players
Atalanta B.C. players
S.S. Arezzo players
Delfino Pescara 1936 players
F.C. Grosseto S.S.D. players
Como 1907 players
Serie A players
Serie B players
Serie C players
Association football central defenders
Footballers from Lazio
Sportspeople from the Metropolitan City of Rome Capital